Mayookham is a 2005 Malayalam film directed by T. Hariharan. It stars Saiju Kurup and Mamta Mohandas in the lead roles. It was their debut movie and also the last Malayalam film for late Sujatha Menon simultaneously.

Plot
Unni Kesavan and Indira are childhood friends. Indira goes to US with her father, a doctor and comes back after many years to their family house. She meets Unni and is shocked to see him as a rebel. She tries to help him by supporting and giving him a new lease of life and slowly love blossoms between the two. Indira become the light in Unni's life and she motivates him to turn responsible. But fate plays dirty as Indira is terminally ill and she goes back for treatment.

Cast

Soundtrack
The soundtrack of this movie was composed by Bombay Ravi to the lyrics penned by Mankombu Gopalakrishnan and T. Hariharan. This was the last Malayalam movie to be composed by Bombay Ravi.

References

External links

2005 films
2000s Malayalam-language films
Films directed by Hariharan
Indian drama films
Films shot in Kannur
Films scored by Ravi